The Scaeosophinae are a subfamily of the Cosmopterigidae.

Genera
Allotalanta
Archisopha
Cyphothyris
Helicacma
Hyalochna
Isostreptis
Protogrypa
Scaeosopha
Scalideutis
Streptothyris
Syntomaula

References

 , 2005: The genus Scaeosopha Meyrick new to China, with descriptions of two new species (Lepidoptera: Cosmopterigidae: Scaeosophinae). The Pan-Pacific Entomologist 80(1-4): 23-28.
 , 2012: Review of the genus Scaeosopha Meyrick, 1914 (Lepidoptera, Cosmopterigidae, Scaeosophinae) in the world, with descriptions of sixteen new species. Zootaxa, 3322: 1-34.

 
Cosmopterigidae
Moth subfamilies